FC Imereti is a Georgian association football club from the town of Khoni. They currently take part in Regionuli Liga, the fifth tier of Georgian league system.

History
Founded in 1936, Imereti spent many years in Georgian Soviet championship under the name Imereti Tsulukidze. The second division has been the highest league they participated at any time  since 1990. 

In 2014/15 Imereti, trained by manager Koba Zhorzhikashvili, won a tight competition against Sulori Vani for promotion to Pirveli Liga. The club pledged to become promotion chasers for the top flight and carry out some reconstruction of the stadium, which was regularly overcrowded during the matches.          

In the next season the club performed below expectations, but still with positive prospect looming ahead. However, near the end of 2016 Imereti were delivered a severe blow. The Disciplinary Committee of Georgian Football Federation upon completion of its investigation on a possible match-fixing incident involving Imereti decided to annul the latter's points in the league table and expel the club to a lower division. The manager was sentenced to a life-long ban on any football activities.   

Back in the third league the club quickly recovered and took part in the promotion round. Simultaneously, Imereti set their own historic record by reaching the fifth round of David Kipiani Cup after having eliminated upper league teams Sioni Bolnisi and Merani Tbilisi. But in the semifinal game they were beaten by Chikhura Sachkhere, who later clinched the Cup title.  

In 2018, Imereti finished in the relegation play-off zone and defeated Regionuli Liga group winner Dinamo Batumi-2 in a two-legged tie for Liga 4. Their troubles continued in this division as well, although two decisions made by GFF regarding the league format in the next two years saved the club from further relegation. 

In the 2021 season, the team still failed to finish above the drop zone and slumped to the bottom of Georgian football leagues.

Seasons

Honours
• Meore Liga

Winners (1): 2014-15 (Group West)

Stadium
Imereti play home matches at a municipal stadium with the capacity of 1,500 seats, named after Ipolite Khvichia, the distinguished Georgian actor born in Khoni district.

Name
Imereti is the name of the province where Khoni is located.

External links

Profile on Soccerway

Page on Facebook

References

  

Football clubs in Georgia (country)
Association football clubs established in 1936